Krzysztof Biegun (born 21 May 1994) is a Polish ski jumper.

Career
Biegun's debut in FIS Ski Jumping World Cup took place in February 2013 in Oberstdorf. On 24 November 2013, he won the event in Klingenthal at large hill. At the 2013 Winter Universiade he took the silver medal in the normal hill event and gold medals in both the large hill and large hill team events.

World Cup

Season standings

Individual victories

Individual starts

References

External links
 

1994 births
Living people
Polish male ski jumpers
People from Żywiec County
Sportspeople from Silesian Voivodeship
Universiade medalists in ski jumping
Universiade gold medalists for Poland
Universiade silver medalists for Poland
Competitors at the 2013 Winter Universiade
21st-century Polish people